Double Bonus is a Singaporean Chinese drama which was telecasted on Singapore's free-to-air channel, MediaCorp Channel 8. It stars Zoe Tay , Terence Cao , Michelle Chia , Zhang Yao Dong , Mimi Chu & Chen Shucheng of this series. This drama serial consists of 23 episodes. It made its debut on 3 Jan 2012 and was screened on Channel 8 at 2100hrs on every weekday night.

Synopsis
Yongjia BBQ Pork is a century old shop famed for its bak kwa. The owner of Yongjia, Jin Wentao (portrayed by Chen Shucheng) is not interested in running the business. So his wife, Shujiao (portrayed by Zhu Mi Mi) is the one who helms it. The profit margin for bak kwa is high, giving rise to the opening of numerous bak kwa shops. Although competition is stiff, Wentao insists on providing his customers good quality bak kwa at reasonable prices. Life is simple and routine for the Jins. The Jins' eldest son, Junjie (portrayed by Terence Cao), is a kind and easy-going person. He graduated from polytechnic and found a well-paying job. However, he quit his job to help out at Yongjia as he could not bear to see Shujiao work so hard. His wife, Meifeng (portrayed by Zoe Tay) is a hardworking and unassuming person who works tirelessly beside her husband without complaint at Yong Xiang. The second son and his wife, Junyang (portrayed by Zhang Yaodong) and Isabella (portrayed by Michelle Chia), are full of drive and ambition. Shujiao quietly helps Junyang to set up his own bak kwa business and finances the venture.

Cast

Star Awards 2013
The series was nominated for only 1 category , Young Talent Award.

Trivia
The show was pre empted on 23 & 24 January due to Chinese New Year Specials.
The show was also pre empted on 22 January due to Chinese New Year Countdown.

Overseas broadcast

External links
Series Synopsis on xinmsn.com

See also
 List of programmes broadcast by Mediacorp Channel 8
 List of Double Bonus episodes
 8gg Blog

References

Singapore Chinese dramas
2012 Singaporean television series debuts
Channel 8 (Singapore) original programming